Velká pardubická is a famous cross-country steeplechase run in Pardubice, Czech Republic since 1874. It takes place every year on the second Sunday in October.

The length of the steeplechase is 6.9 km (4 miles 506 yards), with 31 obstacles. It usually takes 9–10 minutes to finish the course; the record is 8:56.01 set by Ribelino in 2015.

Horses starting in the race must be at least six years old (before 2009, the minimum age was seven years); Czech horses must qualify by finishing at least one of four qualifying races during the season.

History

The race was first run in 1874 in Pardubice, a town long known in the horse racing world, as some trainers and jockeys from England came there to work. The current steeplechase course was established in 1856, however the course first took its present-day form in the years just after the Second World War.

The course of the race has been changed several times, most recently in 1998 when the direction of the final phase of the race was changed to accommodate the new grandstand. The surface of the racecourse is mainly grass, but one-quarter of the race is run through ploughed fields, which used to take almost half of the race in the past. Some obstacles have also been changed, mostly to improve safety, although the difficulty of the race is said to have suffered as a result.

Obstacles
Horses must negotiate a total of 31 obstacles. These are:
 1 - Hedge (1.2m)
 2 - Hedge with ditch (1.3m, with a 60 cm ditch on the other side)
 3 - Small water jump (3m long)
 4 - Taxis ditch. (This is the most famous obstacle in the race, and it is jumped just once. 28 horses have died at this obstacle. In the past it consisted of a 2 m deep and 5 m long ditch hidden behind a 1.5 m high hedge. It was changed before the 1994 race to be a 1 m deep and 4 m long ditch with a 1.5 m high hedge. For the 2021 race the obstacle will have a 0.75 m deep ditch and 5 m long ditch with a 1.35 m to 1.45 m high hedge. This obstacle is used only for the Velká pardubická, and horses are not permitted to use it for training.)
 5 - Irish bank. (This unusual obstacle requires the horses to shimmy up and down a steep artificial bank.)
 6 - Popkovic ditch. (1.3m hedge with a 2m long ditch on the other side)
 7 - French jump. A pair of closely spaced hedges, 1.2m and 1.3m in height, which must be jumped as one.
 8 & 9 - Small gardens. A pair of hedges, 1.25m and 1.3m in height, which are jumped in quick succession.
 10 - English jump. (1.2m hedge with a ditch on the takeoff side)
 10a - Extended taxis ditch. (Small hedge, about 1.1m tall, which joins with the main taxis ditch)
 11 - Hedge with ditch. (1.3m, with a ditch on the landing side)
 12 - Hedge. (1.2 m high and 1.3 m wide hedge with a 60 cm. The landing side is 0.5 m lower than the takeoff side)
 13 - Hedge. (1.3 m high and wide hedge that's 0.8 m high)
 14 - Polper's Jump. (0.8 m high double railing. It is named after the famous interwar rider and two-time winner of the Grand Cpt. Rudolf Popler, who tragically perished on this jump in 1932. In 1991, the phenomenal Železník fell here, but jockey Josef Váni senior, remounted and Železník went on to claim his fourth victory.)
 15 - Drop Bank. (In front of the stands. It is a two-meter drop.)
 16 - Stone Wall. (Stone wall in front of the stands 0.8 m wide and 0.85 m high wall, which is approached from a plowed field.)
 17 - Water Trough. (The largest water obstacle in the race. It is used to be 2 m deep but since the 1990s it has been changed to be 4.5 m wide and 0.7 m lower rebound compared to the original rebound.)
 18 - Large Moat.  (In the past the second most feared obstacle behind Taxis Ditch now 4 m wide and 0.45 m deep.)
 19 - Mini Taxis drop. (The last of the three 'Taxis' ditch on the course. The hedge is 1.5 m high, 2 m wide and there is a 1.7 m ditch on the landing side.)
 20 & 21 - Small gardens. (A pair of hedges, 1.25m and 1.3m in height, which are jumped in quick succession.)
 22 - Open Brook. (A simple ditch with a white bounce beam which in the past where not there which lead to horses not seeing the brook. The brook is 3m wide and 0.9 m deep.)
 23 - Steeplechase obstacle. (Steeplechase jumps have replaced wicker obstacles, which are no longer jumped. This fence is 1.3 m high and 0.6 m wide.)
 24 - "At the hanger hedge" Hedge. (Named after it closeness to hangers by a nearby airport. It is a 1.3 m high and wide hedge. 0.6 m in front of it is an 0.8 m high bouncing crossbar.)
 25 - Big English jump. (0.5 m high and 1.6 m wide hedge, 0.6 m in front of it stands an 0.8 m high bounce beam. The difficulty of the obstacle is the landing, because the landing area is 40 cm higher than the takeoff side. Often causes problems in the wet.)
 26 - American post and rails. (2.4 m wide ditch with a 0.5 m high bounce beam.)
 27 - Havel's Jump. (1.4 m high and 1.9 m wide hedge with an 0.8 m high bounce beam at a distance of 0.5 m in front of the fence, followed by a 2.5 m wide shallow ditch. The difficulty of the jump is mainly due to its closeness to the end of the race.)
 28 - Steeplechase obstacle. (1.3 m high and 0.6 m wide)
 29 - Steeplechase obstacle. (1.3 m high and 0.6 m wide)
 30 - Steeplechase obstacle. (1.3 m high and 0.6 m wide)

Curiosities
Historically, the most successful horse in the race was Železník. The horse won the race four times (from 1987 to 1989 and again in 1991).

Josef Váňa Sr. is the most successful jockey, having achieved eight victories, and he is also a very well known celebrity in the Czech Republic. There is a 2012 movie about him (Váňa, directed by Jakub Wagner). He has also trained 10 winners of the Velká Pardubická and six horses which have finished in second place.

The first (and only woman) to have won the race as of 2019 is Countess Lata Brandisová (1896-1981), who won in 1937 with her mare, Norma - seven lengths ahead of the professional jockey Willibald Schlagbaum in second place. Only 10 of the 15 runners finished. She was the first woman to enter the race in 1927 (falling five times and remounting to finish fifth). In later years she came in fourth, third and second on Norma.

The 1937 Grand Pardubice was the last race held for nearly a decade. The 1938 race was called off following the Munich Agreement and not run during World War II.

Winners

 R – track record

References

 Racing Post:

External links
 Official website of Pardubice Racecourse

Steeplechase (horse racing)
Horse racing in the Czech Republic
Sport in Pardubice
Recurring sporting events established in 1874